Grace Joana Ella Jale (born 10 April 1999) is an association football midfielder who plays for Canberra United and the New Zealand women's national football team. She has previously played for Wellington Phoenix.

Early life
Born and raised in Auckland to a Fijian father and New Zealand mother, Jale started playing football (soccer) at age 7. She attended Mt Albert Grammar School where she helped the team to a national First XI championship. She also played for the Eastern Suburbs premier women's team. During her first year playing for the Bay Olympic Club Team, she was named Player of the Year and was awarded a Variety Gold Heart Scholarship.

Club career
In August 2018, Jale was offered a contract with Czech first-division club AC Sparta Praha, but opted to attend and play for Wake Forest University in Winston-Salem, North Carolina in the United States.

On 19 October 2021 Jale signed with the newly formed Wellington Phoenix team to play in their inaugural season of the 2021–22 A-League Women league.

In July 2022, following a successful season with Wellington Phoenix, Jale joined for Australian A-League Women club Canberra United on a two-year contract.

International career
Jale made her debut for the senior national team and scored her first international goal during a match against Tonga at the 2018 OFC Women's Nations Cup. She previously represented New Zealand on the under-17 and under-20 national teams. She competed at the 2016 FIFA U-17 Women's World Cup in Jordan and 2016 FIFA U-20 Women's World Cup in Papua New Guinea.

International goals

References

External links
 

1999 births
Living people
New Zealand women's association footballers
Association footballers from Auckland
New Zealand women's international footballers
Women's association football midfielders
New Zealand Māori sportspeople
New Zealand Māori women
Wellington Phoenix FC (A-League Women) players
Canberra United FC players
Expatriate women's soccer players in Australia
New Zealand expatriate sportspeople in Australia
New Zealand expatriate women's association footballers